KHMC and KHMC-FM1 (95.9 FM) is a terrestrial American radio station, relayed by a licensed FM booster, broadcasting a Tejano format. Licensed to Goliad, Texas, the station serves the Victoria, Texas area, and is owned by Minerva R. Lopez.

References

External links
 KHMC's webpage
 

HMC